is the first live concert video released by Japanese novelty heavy metal band Animetal. Released by Sony Records on May 21, 1997, it was recorded at the band's debut concert at the Shibuya Club Quattro on March 23, 1997. The full audio version of this concert was released on double-CD On October 1, 1999, as Complete First Live. Animetalive was re-released on DVD on November 23, 2005.

Track listing
All tracks are arranged by Animetal.

Personnel
 - Lead vocals
 - Guitar
Masaki - Bass
 - Drums
 - Lead vocals (Animetal Lady)

with

 - Guitar

References

External links 
 

Animetal albums
1997 video albums
Live video albums
Sony Music Entertainment Japan live albums